Jorma Leo Kalevi Uotinen (b. 28 June 1950 in Pori) is a Finnish dancer, singer and choreographer. As a dancer and choreographer, Uotinen has worked both in many dance groups, both in and outside of Finland, since 1970. He has received many Finnish and international awards and honours in his career.

He was a dancer with the Finnish National Ballet 1970–1976, and in 1976 he was invited by director Carolyn Carlson to join the Groupe de recherche Theatrales at l'Opera de Paris, where he worked until 1980. He has worked as artistic director in the Helsinki City Theatre dance group (1987–1990), at the Finnish National Ballet (1992–2001) and the Kuopio Dance Festival (2000–). He has successfully made use of his international connections in directing these institutions, e.g. by inviting Sylvie Guillem to stage her version of Giselle at the Finnish National Ballet in 1998.

After an active career as a dancer, Uotinen has moved to perform by singing.

Uotinen was a judge in the 2006, 2007 and 2008 seasons of Tanssii tähtien kanssa, the Finnish version of Dancing With the Stars.

Uotinen is bisexual. He was in a relationship with Finnish singer Helena Lindgren whom he lived with for almost 20 years.

Uotinen is UNICEF ambassador of good will. In 2007, he was a voiceover actor in Rottatouille, the Finnish version of Ratatouille.

Productions
 Möröt vastaan muukalaiset (Galaksarin ääninäyttelijä), 2009
 Black Water, Skånesin Tanssiteatteri 2009 
 Ruska, PDC 2009
 Piaf Piaf, Barka-teatteri 2008 
 Rottatouille (Skinnerin ääninäyttelijä), 2007
 Kevätuhri, Tanskan Kuninkaallinen baletti 2007
 Colours, Suomen Kansallisbaletti  2006
 Jord, Tanskan Kuninkaallinen baletti 2006 
 Sentimental Secrets, Konsertti 2005 
 Pateettinen baletti, Firenzen Ooppera 2005
 J'ai peur d'aimer/Pelkään rakastaa, Konsertti 2004 
 Avanto, Grand Theatre de Geneve 2003 
 La Chute de Cheval, Introtanssi 2003 
 Svansjö2, Ooppera 2002 
 So-called Carmen, Introdans 2001
 Tulips, Introdans 2001
 Baldur, Islantilainen baletti 2000  
 Uni, Introdans 2000 
 Evankeliumi, Suomen kansanbaletti 1999 
 Man who never was, solotyö 1998 
 Halla  1995 
 Petrushka, Finnish National Ballet 1994 
 Kaapeli, Finnish National Ballet 1993 
 La Diva, solo work 1991 
 Ballet Pathetique, Helsinki City Theatre 1989 
 Piaf Piaf, Helsinki City Theatre 1989 
 B12, solo for Tero Saarinen 1988 
 Uhri, Finnish National Ballet 1986 
 Reves glaces, Opera de Paris (G.R.C.O.P) 1986 
 Atem, Teatro La Scala Milano 1985 
 Kalevala, Helsingin kaupunginteatteri Helsinki 1985 
 Anonyymit, Helsingin kaupunginteatteri Helsinki 1984
 Anonyymit, Teatro La Fenice Venetsia 1984 
 Black ink on white paper, Collage dansgrupp Oslo 1984 
 Bambola, Teatterikorkeakoulu Helsinki 1984 
 Peter Pan, Helsingin kaupunginteatteri Helsinki 1984 
 Huuto, Studio-galleria Julius Helsinki 1984 
 Askeleet, Helsingin kaupunginteatteri Helsinki 1983 
 Chicago, Helsingin kaupunginteatteri Helsinki 1983 
 Locked doors, 1983 
 Pierrot Lunaire, Teatro La Scala Milano 1983 
 Julius Almeria, Studio-galleria Julius Helsinki 1983 
 Orfeus ja Eurydike, Teatro La Fenice Venetsia 1982
 Orlando, Paladino Theater an der Wien Wien 1982
 Unisono, Helsingin kaupunginteatteri Helsinki 1982
 Loputon arvoitus, Helsingin kaupunginteatteri Helsinki 1982
 Unohdettu horisontti, Helsingin juhlaviikot Helsinki 1980
 Paljastusten aakkoset, Tanssiteatteri Rollo Helsinki 1979
 Jojo, Theatre Bouffes du Nord Pariisi 1979
 Aspekteja, Suomen kansallisooppera Helsinki 1974

References

External links
 Jorma Uotinen's homepage
 Jorma Uotinen's concert in Hungary

Bisexual male actors
Bisexual singers
Bisexual dancers
Finnish male ballet dancers
Finnish LGBT singers
Finnish LGBT actors
Finnish bisexual people
Living people
Finnish choreographers
1950 births
People from Pori